Michael Gregory Kerran Burgess (born 8 July 1994) is an English cricketer who plays for Warwickshire County Cricket Club. A wicketkeeper batsman, Burgess came through the Surrey Academy, making a total of 31 appearances at 2nd XI level between 2011 and 2013.

He was educated at Homefield Preparatory and Cranleigh School in Surrey, and at Loughborough University, where he obtained an Upper Second Class honours BSc in Sports and Exercise Science.

Burgess made his first-class cricket debut for Loughborough MCCU against Sussex at Hove. In April 2015 in a non first-class game Burgess scored 116 against a Kent attack including first XI players Matt Coles and Adam Riley. Later than year he made his List A cricket debut for Leicestershire vs. Northamptonshire, in his second list A match he was again run out on 49 vs. Gloucestershire. In May 2016 Burgess scored 98 against the touring Sri Lankans in a first-class match.

He was released by Leicestershire at the end of the 2016 season, joining Sussex County Cricket Club on a non contract basis in March 2017. A series of good performances with bat and gloves in both red and white ball formats led to the award of a one-year contract in August of that year. This was promptly extended for a further year after he hit a career-best 146 v Nottinghamshire in the final County Championship match of the season at Hove.  He moved to Warwickshire in May 2019, his opportunities at Sussex being limited by Ben Brown, establishing himself as their first-choice keeper in all three formats in 2021. He started the 2022 summer with a career-best 178 against Surrey.  

Burgess played club cricket for Cheam and Reigate Priory in the ECB Premier Division of the Surrey Championships and for Adelaide University in the South Australian Cricket Association.

References

External links
 

1994 births
Living people
English cricketers
Cricketers from Epsom
Leicestershire cricketers
Loughborough MCCU cricketers
Sussex cricketers
Warwickshire cricketers
Marylebone Cricket Club cricketers
Wicket-keepers